Elite Institute of Engineering and Management is a coeducational, private diploma Engineering college located in sub-urban of Kolkata, West Bengal, West Bengal (India), India.  It offers Diploma courses in Engineering and Technology. The college was set up by the Pinnaccle Educational Trust in 2009.

Accreditation and affiliation 
Elitte Institute of Engineering and Management is approved by the All India Council of Technical Education (AICTE) and is affiliated to West Bengal State Council of Technical Education (WBSCTE) [for all engineering and technological courses]. It is recognized by the Government of West Bengal.

Admission
At the diploma level, students are primarily admitted on the basis of the ranks in the state-level engineering entrance examination for Polytechnic - JEXPO & VOCLET.

Courses

Diploma Courses
 Computer Science and Technology
 Electronics & Telecommunication Engineering
 Mechanical Engineering
 Civil Engineering
 Electrical Engineering
 Automobile Engineering

Diploma Management Courses
 Hotel Management

Location

College

P.O. Karnamadhavpur,
P.S.-Ghola, Near Mohispota
Kolkata-700113,
(Near Namaz-para, Kalyani Express Highway,)

Kolkata City Office

48B, Dr.Sundari Mohan Avenue
4th Floor
Kolkata - 700014

References

External links
 

Engineering colleges in Kolkata
Educational institutions established in 2009
2009 establishments in West Bengal